In social choice theory, May's theorem states that simple majority voting is the only anonymous, neutral, and positively responsive social choice function between two alternatives. Further, this procedure is resolute when there are an odd number of voters and ties (indecision) are not allowed. Kenneth May first published this theorem in 1952.

Various modifications have been suggested by others since the original publication. Mark Fey extended the proof to an infinite number of voters. Robert Goodin and Christian List showed that, among methods of aggregating first-preference votes over multiple alternatives, plurality rule uniquely satisfies May's conditions; under approval balloting, a similar statement can be made about approval voting.

Arrow's theorem in particular does not apply to the case of two candidates, so this possibility result can be seen as a mirror analogue of that theorem. (Note that anonymity is a stronger form of non-dictatorship.)

Another way of explaining the fact that simple majority voting can successfully deal with at most two alternatives is to cite Nakamura's theorem. The theorem states that the number of alternatives that a rule can deal with successfully is less than the Nakamura number of the rule. The Nakamura number of simple majority voting is 3, except in the case of four voters. Supermajority rules may have greater Nakamura numbers.

Formal statement
Condition 1. The group decision function sends each set of preferences to a unique winner. (resolute, unrestricted domain)
Condition 2. The group decision function treats each voter identically. (anonymity)
Condition 3. The group decision function treats both outcomes the same, in that reversing each set of preferences reverses the group preference. (neutrality)
Condition 4. If the group decision was 0 or 1 and a voter raises a vote from −1 to 0 or 1, or from 0 to 1, the group decision is 1. (positive responsiveness)

Theorem: A group decision function with an odd number of voters meets conditions 1, 2, 3, and 4 if and only if it is the simple majority method.

Notes
May, Kenneth O. 1952. "A set of independent necessary and sufficient conditions for simple majority decisions", Econometrica, Vol. 20, Issue 4, pp. 680–684. 
Mark Fey, "May’s Theorem with an Infinite Population", Social Choice and Welfare, 2004, Vol. 23, issue 2, pages 275–293.
Goodin, Robert and Christian List (2006). "A conditional defense of plurality rule: generalizing May's theorem in a restricted informational environment," American Journal of Political Science, Vol. 50, issue 4, pages 940-949.

References

Alan D. Taylor (2005). Social Choice and the Mathematics of Manipulation, 1st edition, Cambridge University Press. . Chapter 1.
Logrolling, May’s theorem and Bureaucracy

Social choice theory
1952 in science
Theorems in discrete mathematics
Voting theory